Raqeeb Se is a Pakistani romantic drama television series produced by Momina Duraid, written by Bee Gul and directed by Kashif Nisar. It aired on Hum TV from 20 January 2021 to 26 May 2021 all under MD Productions. Raqeeb Se revolves around the repercussions of a love story stretched around one's entire life. It features an ensemble cast of Hadiqa Kiani, Nauman Ijaz, Sania Saeed, Iqra Aziz, Faryal Mehmood and Saqib Sumeer.

The series received critical acclaim due to its storyline and performances of the cast. At 21st Lux Style Awards, it got most number of nominations, and won Best TV Director and two awards for Kiani; Best Emerging Talent in TV and Best TV Actress-Critics' choice.

Plot
The television series is centered around four women and the men around them. Sakina takes her daughter and flees from her abusive husband. She seeks shelter at her former lover Maqsood Sahab's house and their love story is so tragic and interesting that his wife, Hajra and daughter, Insha, know it by heart.

Hajra consoles Sakina and takes care of her and her daughter while Insha considers it an injustice to her mother.

Cast 
 Hadiqa Kiani as Sakina
 Noman Ejaz as Maqsood
 Sania Saeed as Hajra
 Iqra Aziz as Ameera, Sakina's daughter
 Faryal Mehmood as Insha, Hajra and Maqsood's daughter
 Saqib Sameer as Rafique, Sakina's husband, later divorced
 Hamza Sohail as Abdul Rahman a.k.a. Abdul, Insha's love interest
 Salman Shahid as Masood, Maqsood's elder brother
 Saba Faisal as Aatka, Masood's wife and Maqsood's sister-in-law
 Hassan Mir as Kashif, Masood and Aatka's son, Ameera's love interest
 Ismat Iqbal as Maasi Anaraan, Sakina and Rafique's neighbor

Music

The title song of Raqeeb Se is composed and performed by Hadiqa Kiani who played one of the lead role in the serial, while lyrics were penned by Khawar Kiani. It marks the return of the singer to the channel, since she performed the OST of channel's hit drama series Yaqeen Ka Safar''' in 2016.

Track listing

 Production 
Background and development
Bee Gul, writer of the drama serial said; “It was a deliberate thought-out decision... I convinced myself that I do not have to write another issue-based serial, for we seem to have amplified and unwillingly exploited social issues by presenting them inconsistently for ratings. The subjects have lost their sensitivity as a result and do not come as hard-hitting narratives anymore. Therefore, I decided to go for something that is equally important, equally meaningful and maybe equally ignored as well, and the sentiment of love came to my mind. This is how Raqeeb Se happened.”

 Casting 
Singer and vocalist Hadiq Kiani was selected to portray the Sakina, one of the leading role, thus series marked her acting debut. Veteran actors Naumaan Ijaz and Sania Saeed were selected to portray the roles of Maqsood and Hajra, previously acted together in Jhumka Jaan (2009) Khamoshiyan (2010), Aao Kahani Buntay Hain (2011) and Sang-e-Mar Mar (2016). Young actors such as Iqra Aziz, Faryal Mehmood and Hamza Sohail, son of veteran actor and comedian Sohail Ahmed were cast in prominent roles. Theater actor Saqib Sumeer was selected to play the role of Rafique Ali, previously offered to Sohail Ahmed. Likewise, Saba Faisal and Salam Shahid were cast in supporting roles of Aatka and Masood respectively.

Reception
The series received critical acclaim due to performances and storyline. Hrithik Sharma of El Viaje Reviews included it into his select list of "Pakistani Gems" and says that "Raqeeb Se is a masterfully written show powered by extraordinary performances, meticulous direction, and euphonious background score". He adds, "The performances are breathtaking. Especially of the three principal characters. Maqsud Saab, played by Nauman Ijaaz brings in exactly the right amounts of charm and helplessness. Hajra, played by Sania Saeed, keeps you wondering whether she is too good to be true, or is she actually happily devoted to Maqsud and Sakeena’s love story. And then, my personal favorite, Hadiqa Kiyani, who towers over every scene and magically dominates every frame that she is part of".The News International'' praised the storyline of the serial and said it "A Breath of Fresh Air". The newspaper also praised the performance of debutants Hadiqa Kiani and Hamza Sohail.

Awards and nominations

References

External links 
 Official website

Pakistani television series
Hum TV original programming
2021 Pakistani television series debuts
Hum TV
Hum Network Limited
Pakistani romantic drama television series
Television series by MD Productions
MD Productions
Television series created by Momina Duraid
2021 Pakistani television series endings
Urdu-language telenovelas
Pakistani telenovelas